The 3rd Mounted Rifles were a light cavalry regiment of the Royal Prussian Army. The regiment was formed 1 October 1905 in Colmar.

See also
List of Imperial German cavalry regiments

References

Mounted Rifles of the Prussian Army
Military units and formations established in 1905
1905 establishments in Germany